After The Storm is a studio album by Ghanaian reggae-dancehall singer Shatta Wale, released by Shatta Movement Music Production on April 29, 2016. Upon its release, it was made available for digital download. On 6 May 2016, the 22 songs, 1 hour and 18 minutes long album was made available for purchase on iTunes.

Commercial performance
Following the release of the album, Shatta Wale announced he was going to go on a European tour but he later cancelled it and only performed at indigo, at The O2 in London on August 26. The 'After the Storm' US tour kicked off on July 1, 2017 in New York  at the PlayStation Theater and Massachusetts at the Hanover Theater on July 8.

Track listing

Release history

References

2016 albums
Shatta Wale albums